The Burnaby class is a ship class of ferries in the BC Ferries' fleet, built between 1964 and 1965. Both are propelled by controllable-pitch propellers. Both were built with two Mirrlees National KVSSM, V-16, 4 stroke-cycle, diesel engines, each producing  at 320 revolutions per minute.

History

Design
The two ships were originally part of a group of seven Victoria-class ships constructed between 1962 and 1965. These seven were soon modified to increase vehicle capacity. The first change was the installation of platform decks or ramps; the second modification saw the ships sliced in half vertically across the beam for the insertion of a  midsection, which dramatically increased the car carrying capacity of the seven ships. Later, five of the seven ships (excluding Queen of Burnaby and Queen of Nanaimo) were cut horizontally from bow to stern and lifted to have a new vehicle deck inserted. As a result, Burnaby and Nanaimo, which had not had the midsection addition, were removed from the Victoria-class designation to become Burnaby-class vessels.

Service
In 1994, Queen of Burnaby was temporarily leased to another provincial crown corporation called Victoria Line. The vessel was renamed Royal Victorian, had a $4.7 million refit, and operated a once-daily summer service between Victoria and Seattle. After the demise of the Victoria Line, the vessel was purchased by Clipper Navigation, which operates the Victoria Clipper passenger-only service between Victoria and Seattle. The vessel was then renamed and repainted to become Princess Marguerite III, operating on the Victoria to Seattle route. In 2000, after Clipper Navigation also decided to end service on the route, the vessel was returned to the BC Ferries fleet under her original name, Queen of Burnaby.

Retirement
Queen of Burnaby was retired in May 2017, and the Queen of Nanaimo was retired in July 2017. They were replaced by three 145-car Salish-class ferries. The larger , which had a major refit of her passenger areas completed in 2009, is expected to see another ten to fifteen years of service and is the sole survivor of the original seven ships.

References

External links 
 
 

 
Ships built in British Columbia
Ferry classes